John Leland (born 1959) is an author and has been a journalist for The New York Times since 2000. Leland began covering retirement and religion in January, 2004. During a stint in 1994, he was editor in chief of Details magazine. Leland was also a senior editor at Newsweek, an editor and columnist at Spin magazine, and a reviewer for Trouser Press.

Leland wrote Hip: The History and Why Kerouac Matters: The Lessons of On the Road (They're Not What You Think).<ref>{{cite web|url=http://theamericanshot.com/back-to-the-future-revisiting-john-lelands-history-of-hip/ | title=Back to the Future: Revisiting John Leland's 'History of Hip'| publisher=The American Shot |date= October 23, 2011}}</ref> In 2018, his book Happiness is a Choice You Make'' was released.

Education
He earned a Bachelor of Arts in English from Columbia College in 1981.

Personal
According to Leland's HarperCollins biographical information, he lives in Manhattan's East Village with his wife, Risa, and son, Jordan.

Awards
Leland has won two awards from the National Association of Black Journalists.

See also
 New Yorkers in journalism

References

The New York Times writers
American columnists
Living people
1959 births
Columbia College (New York) alumni
Newsweek people
American magazine editors
20th-century American journalists
American male journalists